Hans Lager (born 24 June 1952) is a Swedish modern pentathlete. He competed at the 1976 Summer Olympics.

References

1952 births
Living people
Swedish male modern pentathletes
Olympic modern pentathletes of Sweden
Modern pentathletes at the 1976 Summer Olympics
Sportspeople from Stockholm